The Annabelle Candy Company, also known as Annabelle's, is a candy manufacturer based in Hayward, California, United States. The company was founded in San Francisco, California in 1950 by Russian immigrant Sam Altshuler, who named the company after his daughter. One of the company's self-proclaimed accomplishments is that its "Rocky Road" bar was ranked among the top 40 best-selling chocolate bars on the West Coast of the United States in 2007.

The company moved to its present location of Hayward in 1965. In 1972 the Annabelle Candy Company purchased the Golden Nugget Company, and in 1978, after acquiring the Cardinet Candy Company, it added the Big Hunk, Look, U-NO, and Abba Zaba candy bars to its line of products.

Products
 Rocky Road Original
 Rocky Road Dark
 Rocky Road Mint
 Rocky Road S'MORES
 Big Hunk
 Abba-Zaba Original
 Abba-Zaba Strawberry
 U-NO
 LOOK!

References

External links
 Annabelle Candy website

 
Companies based in Hayward, California
Food and drink companies established in 1950
1950 establishments in California
Food and drink in the San Francisco Bay Area
Confectionery companies based in California